Roberto García may refer to:

 Roberto García (bassist) (born 1972), Spanish bassist for the band WarCry
 Robert Garcia (American boxer) (born 1975), American boxer and trainer
 Roberto García (Mexican boxer) (born 1980), Mexican boxer
 Roberto García (cyclist) (born 1937), Salvadoran Olympic cyclist
 Roberto García (runner) (born 1975), Spanish long-distance runner
 Roberto García Cabello (born 1980), Spanish football (soccer) player
 Roberto García Morillo (1911–2003), Argentine composer, musicologist, and music critic
 Roberto García Orozco (born 1974), Mexican referee
 Roberto García Parrondo (born 1980), Spanish team handball player
 Roberto Alcaide Garcia (born 1978), Spanish cyclist 
 Roberto Marcos García (1956–2006), Mexican journalist

See also 
 Robert Garcia (disambiguation)